Zollgrenzschutz (ZGS) was an organization under the German Finance Ministry from 1937 to 1945. It was charged with guarding Germany's borders, acting as a combination Border Patrol and Customs & Immigration service.

History
It originated in the early 19th century as a tariff enforcement unit of the Prussian government. 
Reorganized in 1919 under the Weimar Republic following World War I, it gradually became more militarized and transformed into a paramilitary force, also due to the economic woes of blockade, inflation and Great Depression.

In Nazi Germany it was reformed again in 1937 by Fritz Reinhardt, a State Secretary of the Finance Ministry. It came to comprise about 50,000 officials. The Border Police (Grenzpolizei), which had the tasks of passport and border control, was different from the Customs Border Guards (Zollgrenzschutz).

Heinrich Himmler tried to bring the Zollgrenzschutz under the control of the Schutzstaffel (SS), which was unsuccessful at first. During the war, the units were used in occupied territories outside of Germany. A significant portion of younger officials were recruited to the Wehrmacht, leaving the Zollgrenzschutz with older men. After the 20 July 1944 assassination attempt on Hitler, the units were taken out of the control of the Finance Ministry and placed under Amt IV (Gestapo) of the Reich Security Main Office (RSHA).

It was deactivated at the end of World War II in Europe when Germany was partitioned.

Grades

Ranks in italics with the prefix Hilfs- belonged to the Zollgrenzschutz-Reserve (ZGS-Reserve) (Customs Border Guards), formerly the Verstärkter Grenzaufsichtsdienst (VGAD) (Reinforced Border Inspection Service).

References

External links
  History of Zollgrenzschutz

Police units of Nazi Germany
Government of Nazi Germany
1945 disestablishments in Germany
Reich Security Main Office